The Civic Party (GP) was a political party in Belarus.

History
The party contested the 1995 parliamentary elections, winning one seat in the fourth round of voting. During the same year it merged with the United Democratic Party to form the United Civic Party of Belarus.

References

Defunct political parties in Belarus
Political parties disestablished in 1995